State of Emergency is the fourth studio album by Australian punk rock band The Living End, released in Australia and New Zealand on 4 February 2006 and internationally on 11 July 2006. It debuted in the number one position of the Australian ARIA charts. The album's first single was "What's on Your Radio", released in November 2005. The follow-up single, "Wake Up" was released on 18 February 2006, and debuted at number 5 on the ARIA charts, making it the highest single debut position of the band (not including the EP Second Solution / Prisoner of Society).

At the J Award of 2006, the album was nominated for Australian Album of the Year.

The limited edition comes with a DVD, documenting the stages of the album's production and shows footage of the band's concerts, including performances as The Longnecks and at Splendour in the Grass. They also released a live DVD of the State of Emergency tour, Live at Festival Hall. A limited edition vinyl of the album, limited to 500 copies worldwide, was also released.

ARIA publicized that State of Emergency had officially achieved 2× platinum status in Australia in November 2007. The album is the band's second highest selling, behind the efforts of their record-breaking debut album.

Background 
In December 2005, The Living End, as The Longnecks, played gigs in Sydney featuring tracks from the album. This was to test out audience reactions to new songs in order to ready themselves for the Big Day Out music festival. Tracks were also given a live airing in festivals of late 2005 and early 2006, such as the 2005 Homebake festival at The Domain, Sydney.

The Living End played at Splendour in the Grass, a music festival in Byron Bay, the day before they were due to start recording State of Emergency. Band members decided that if they got positive reactions during their performance, they'd do well producing the record and be in the right frame of mind to do so.

Track listing

How to Make an Album and Influence People 
How to Make an Album and Influence People is a documentary DVD covering the making of State of Emergency, showing live and behind the scenes footage of the band. Starting from laying down the basic tracks in a practice studio, to the re-introduction of Nick Launay (producer of the band's second studio album, Roll On) and playing a gig at Splendour in the Grass in 2005, before heading to the studio to record and mix the album. The DVD came as a bonus with the limited edition album.

Personnel 

The Living End
 Chris Cheney – vocals, guitar
 Scott Owen – double bass, backing vocals
 Andy Strachan – drums, backing vocals

Backing vocals on "Wake Up"
 Christina Bell
 Michael Bell
 John Boneventura
 Ruby Bryant
 Olivia Bunting
 Eva Conner
 Scarlett Conner
 Jessica Dredge
 Alan Gibson
 Mila Grant
 India Murphy
 D'arcy Noonan
 Mia Quinsee-Jarvis
 Rebecca Schwarz
 Nicholas Schwarz

Visuals and imagery
 Alison Smith – art direction
 Chris Cheney – art direction
 James Pipino – cover photography, studio photography
 Martin Philby – booklet photography
 Scott Ebsary – disc photography

Instruments
 Justine Jones – horns
 Jack Howard – horns
 Jeremy Smith – horns
 Michael Waters – horns

Technical and production
 Nick Launay – production, mixing, engineering
 Jimmi Maroudas – mixing of "Into the Red"
 Steve Smart – mastering
 Matt Handley – guitar tech
 Ant Milne – drum tech, bass tech

Managerial
 Rae Harvey – management
 Josh O'Donnell – A&R
 Stephen Zagami – tour management
 Jim Scott – FOH
 Owen Orford – bookings
 Darryl Eaton – bookings
 Mike Dewdney – bookings

Charts

Weekly charts

Year-end charts

Certifications

Release history

References 

2006 albums
The Living End albums
Adeline Records albums
Albums produced by Nick Launay